"In the Blood" is a song by American alternative rock group Better Than Ezra. It was released in June 1995 as the second single from the band's major-label debut album Deluxe. The song peaked at number four on the Billboard Modern Rock Tracks chart and number six on the Mainstream Rock Tracks chart. The song was not eligible to chart on the Hot 100 because no commercial single was made available for purchase. However, the song received enough radio airplay to peak at number 48 on the Hot 100 Airplay chart.

Music video
The music video for the song was directed by Frank W. Ockenfels III. As with "Good", the band's previous single, "In the Blood" saw success at radio before the video aired on MTV.

Track listing
 "In the Blood" (Edit Remix)
 "In the Blood" (LP Version Remix)

Note: Promotional CD.

Chart performance

References

Better Than Ezra songs
1995 singles
Black-and-white music videos
Songs written by Kevin Griffin
1993 songs